California's 62nd State Assembly district is one of 80 California State Assembly districts. It is currently represented by Democrat Tina McKinnor of Hawthorne.

District profile 
The district encompasses the northern South Bay region and the southern part of the Westside, extending from South Los Angeles to the Pacific Ocean. Heavily urban and ethnically diverse, the district is centered on Los Angeles International Airport.

Los Angeles County – 4.8%
 El Segundo
 Gardena – 25.8%
 Hawthorne
 Inglewood – 99.7%
 Lawndale
 Lennox
 Los Angeles – 3.5%
 Venice
 Westchester – partial
 Marina del Rey
 West Athens
 Westmont – partial

Election results from statewide races

List of Assembly Members
Due to redistricting, the 62nd district has been moved around different parts of the state. The current iteration resulted from the 2011 redistricting by the California Citizens Redistricting Commission.

Election results 1992 - present

2020

2018

2016

2014

2012

2010

2008

2006

2004

2002

2000

1998

1996

1994

1992

See also 
 California State Assembly
 California State Assembly districts
 Districts in California

References

External links 
 District map from the California Citizens Redistricting Commission

62
Government of Los Angeles County, California
Government of Los Angeles
Westside (Los Angeles County)
El Segundo, California
Gardena, California
Hawthorne, California
Inglewood, California
Lawndale, California
Marina del Rey, California
Playa del Rey, Los Angeles
Playa Vista, Los Angeles
Venice, Los Angeles
Westchester, Los Angeles